Chondrostereum is a genus of fungi in the family Cyphellaceae. The type species, Chondrostereum purpureum, causes the disease called silver leaf.

Species
Chondrostereum coprosmae (G.Cunn.) Stalpers (1985)
Chondrostereum himalaicum (K.S.Thind & S.S.Rattan) S.S. Rattan (1977)
Chondrostereum purpureum (Pers.) Pouzar (1959)
Chondrostereum vesiculosum (G.Cunn.) Stalpers & P.K.Buchanan (1991)

Cyphellaceae
Agaricales genera